Eternal is the fifth full-length album by Christian metal band War of Ages. The album was released in the United States on April 13, 2010. It is the last album by the band to feature rhythm guitarist Branon Bernatowicz, and bassist T.J. Alford.

Track listing

Personnel 
War of Ages
 Leroy Hamp – lead vocals
 Steve Brown – lead guitar, backing vocals 
 Branon Bernatowicz – rhythm guitar, backing vocals
 T.J. Alford – bass, backing vocals
 Alex Hamp – drums

Guest musicians
Tim Lambesis (As I Lay Dying, Austrian Death Machine) – vocals on track 2
Sonny Sandoval (P.O.D.) – vocals on track 5
Josh Gilbert (As I Lay Dying) – vocals on track 7

Production
Produced by Tim Lambesis, War of Ages
Engineered by Daniel Castleman, Kelly Cairns
Mastered by Troy Glessner at Spectre Studio

All songs written by War of Ages / Mounden Music (ASCAP)
All lyrics written by Leroy Hamp / Vernonhamp Music (ASCAP)

References

2010 albums
War of Ages albums
Facedown Records albums